Jean-Paul-Égide Martini, also known as Jean-Paul-Gilles Martini (31 August 1741 – 14 February 1816;) was a French composer of German birth during the classical period. He is best known today for the vocal romance "Plaisir d'amour," on which the 1961 Elvis Presley pop standard "Can't Help Falling in Love" is based. He is often confused with the Italian composer Giovanni Battista Martini, so is sometimes known as Martini Il Tedesco ("Martini The German").

Life and career
Martini was born Johann Paul Aegidius Martin in Freystadt, Bavaria as son of the schoolmaster Andreas Martin and his wife Barbara. He was educated at the Jesuit seminary in Neuburg an der Donau and later started a study of philosophy in Freiburg im Breisgau, which he quit unfinished. He temporarily adopted the code name "Schwarzendorf", presumably trying to cover his tracks for the fear of being urged to refund his education cost.  He re-adopted his original family name in the Italianized form "Martini" after moving to France.  There, he established a successful career as a court musician.  In 1764, he married Marguerite Camelot.  Having directed concerts for queen Marie Antoinette, he adapted to the changing regimes throughout the French Revolution, and later wrote music for Napoleon's marriage as well as for the restored Chapelle royale.  His melodic opera L'amoureux de quinze ans, written in 1771, enjoyed great success.  In addition, his highly popular church music combined old forms with modern theatricality, and his chansons including "Plaisir d'amour" were influential.  In 1788, he paid 16.000 livres to become surintendant de la musique du roi.  He was designated to take office after his predecessor's death, however the outbreak of the French Revolution prevented this.  Martini lost all his functions and took flight to Lyon.  In 1800 he became a professor of composition at the Paris Conservatoire.  In 1814, after the Bourbon Restoration, Martini was finally appointed surintendant de la musique du roi, the post that he had been promised more than 25 years earlier.  His last composition was a requiem in honour of Louis XVI of France, which he performed in the Basilica of St Denis on 21 January 1816, the anniversary day of the monarch's execution.  He died in Paris in February 1816 at the age of 74.

Selected list of works
Annette and Lubin (opera);
Sappho (opera, 1794), with libretto by Constance de Pipelet de Leury (i.e. Constance zu Salm-Reifferscheidt-Dyck);
L'amoureux de quinze ans, ou La double fête (1771);
Henri IV (1774);
Le Droit du Seigneur (1783);
Plaisir d'amour, song (1784);
"Prière pour le Roi", political song (1793);
Scene héroïque pour Napoléon (1814).

Notes

References

Sources 
  
 "Jean Paul Martini" in Classical Music, ed. John Burrows.  DK Publishing, Inc: New York, 2005.

External links
 
 

18th-century classical composers
18th-century French people
18th-century German people
French classical composers
French male classical composers
German male classical composers
German Classical-period composers
French people of German descent
People from Neumarkt (district)
1741 births
1816 deaths
Academic staff of the Conservatoire de Paris
18th-century German composers
18th-century French composers
18th-century French male musicians
19th-century German male musicians